This is a list of seasons completed by the Cincinnati Bearcats men's college basketball team.

Seasons

Notes

Cincinnati Bearcats

Cincinnati Bearcats basketball seasons